The 2003 New Brunswick general election was held on June 9, 2003, to elect 55 members to the 55th New Brunswick Legislative Assembly. Although polls initially suggested a landslide victory for Premier Bernard Lord's Progressive Conservative Party of New Brunswick, the dynamics of the race shifted after Shawn Graham, leader of the Liberal Party of New Brunswick, took on auto insurance rates as a key issue of his campaign. Lord and the Progressive Conservatives were ultimately re-elected by a narrow margin of just 2 seats.

Campaign
Leading up to the election, New Brunswick its car insurance rates skyrocket. The Liberal Party of New Brunswick consequently focused its campaign on three points:
 improved universal health care, 
 keeping the province's electric utility, NB Power, as a public crown corporation, and 
 the lowering of automobile insurance rates.

On the other hand, the campaign of Premier Bernard Lord and his Progressive Conservative Party faced a number of problems, especially after changing its position on the key issue of auto insurance several times during the 30-day campaign.

The results were very close, and for most of election night as the results came in, the winner was unclear. Shawn Graham was even heard to remark on television as the night was drawing to a close that "Up to 5 minutes ago, I thought I was Premier".

New Democratic Party of New Brunswick leader Elizabeth Weir was the only member of her party to win a seat.  The party ran 55 candidates throughout the province.

The newly founded but short-lived New Brunswick Grey Party, a branch of the Grey Party of Canada, also ran 10 candidates, including party leader Jim Webb.

Results

Results by party

|- style="background-color:#CCCCCC"
!rowspan="2" colspan="2" style="text-align:center;"|Party
!rowspan="2" style="text-align:center;"|Party leader
!rowspan="2" style="text-align:center;"|# ofcandidates
!colspan="4" style="text-align:center;"|Seats
!colspan="3" style="text-align:center;"|Popular vote
|- style="background-color:#CCCCCC"
| style="text-align:center;" |1999
| style="text-align:center;" |Dissolution
| style="text-align:center;" |Elected
| style="text-align:center;" |% Change
| style="text-align:center;" |#
| style="text-align:center;" |%
| style="text-align:center;" |Change

| style="text-align:left;" |Bernard Lord
| style="text-align:right;" |55
| style="text-align:right;" |44
| style="text-align:right;" |46
| style="text-align:right;" |28
| style="text-align:right;" |-39.1%
| style="text-align:right;" |174,092
| style="text-align:right;" |45.45%
| style="text-align:right;" |-7.6%

| style="text-align:left;" |Shawn Graham
| style="text-align:right;" |55
| style="text-align:right;" |10
| style="text-align:right;" |7
| style="text-align:right;" |26
| style="text-align:right;" |+271%
| style="text-align:right;" |170,028
| style="text-align:right;" |44.39%
| style="text-align:right;" |+7.1%

| style="text-align:left;" |Elizabeth Weir
| style="text-align:right;" |55
| style="text-align:right;" |1
| style="text-align:right;" |1
| style="text-align:right;" |1
| style="text-align:right;" |-
| style="text-align:right;" |36,989
| style="text-align:right;" |9.66%
| style="text-align:right;" |+0.9%

| style="text-align:left;" |Jim Webb
| style="text-align:right;" |10
| style="text-align:right;" |n/a1
| style="text-align:right;" |-
| style="text-align:right;" |-
| style="text-align:right;" | 
| style="text-align:right;" |1,550
| style="text-align:right;" |0.40%
| style="text-align:right;" |n/a1

| colspan="2" style="text-align:left;" |Independent
| style="text-align:right;" |2
| style="text-align:right;" |-
| style="text-align:right;" |-
| style="text-align:right;" |-
| style="text-align:right;" | 
| style="text-align:right;" |415
| style="text-align:right;" |0.11%
| style="text-align:right;" |-0.1%

| style="text-align:left;" colspan="4" |Vacant
| style="text-align:right;" |1
| style="text-align:center;" colspan="5" | 
|-
| style="text-align:left;" colspan="3" |Total
| style="text-align:right;" |177
| style="text-align:right;" |55
| style="text-align:right;" |55
| style="text-align:right;" |55
| style="text-align:right;" |-
| style="text-align:right;" |383,074
|colspan="2"|100%
|-
| style="text-align:left;" colspan="11" |Source: http://www.gnb.ca/elections
|-
|}1 The Grey Party did not contest the 1999 election.

Results by region

Candidates
Party leaders and cabinet ministers are denoted in bold.

Northern New Brunswick

|-
| style="background:whitesmoke;"|1. Restigouche West
|
|Benoît Cyr 2,523
||
|Burt Paulin 4,008
|
|Antoine Duguay 257
|
| 
||
|Benoît Cyr
|-
| style="background:whitesmoke;"|2. Campbellton
|
|Jean F. Dubé 2,771
||
|Roy Boudreau 3,979
|
|Murray Mason 294
|
| 
||
|Jean F. Dubé
|-
| style="background:whitesmoke;"|3. Dalhousie-Restigouche East
|
|Paul McIntyre 3,088
||
|Donald Arseneault 3,445
|
|Joel Hickey 645
|
| 
||
|Dennis Furlong
|-
| style="background:whitesmoke;"|4. Nigadoo-Chaleur
|
|Hermel Vienneau 3,529
||
|Roland Haché 3,887
|
|Kate Hayward 380
|
| 
||
|Roland Haché
|-
| style="background:whitesmoke;"|5. Bathurst
|
|Nancy MacKay 3,252
||
|Brian Kenny 3,348
|
|Mark Robar 304
|
| 
||
|Marcelle Mersereau
|-
| style="background:whitesmoke;"|6. Nepisiguit
|
|Joel Bernard 2,200
||
|Frank Branch 3,498
|
|Normand Savoie 894
|
| 
||
|Joel Bernard
|-
| style="background:whitesmoke;"|7. Caraquet
|
|Gaston Moore 3,550
||
|Hédard Albert 3,649
|
|Gérard Béland 457
|
| 
||
|Gaston Moore
|-
| style="background:whitesmoke;"|8. Lamèque-Shippagan-Miscou
||
|Paul Robichaud 4,788
|
|Denis Roussel 2,846
|
|Jean-Baptiste Bezeau 335
|
| 
||
|Paul Robichaud
|-
| style="background:whitesmoke;"|9. Centre-Péninsule
|
|Louis-Philippe McGraw 3,045
||
|Denis Landry 3,097
|
|Rose Duguay 396
|
| 
||
|Louis-Phillipe McGraw
|-
| style="background:whitesmoke;"|10. Tracadie-Sheila
||
|Elvy Robichaud 4,583
|
|Weldon McLaughlin 2,894
|
|Stéphane Richardson 661
|
| 
||
|Elvy Robichaud
|}

Eastern New Brunswick

|-
| style="background:whitesmoke;"|11. Miramichi Bay
|
|Réjean Savoie 3,050
||
|Carmel Robichaud 3,227
|
|Hilaire Rouselle 729
|
| 
||
|Réjean Savoie
|-
| style="background:whitesmoke;"|12. Miramichi-Bay du Vin
||
|Michael Malley 3,917
|
|Frank Trevors 3,464
|
|Dwayne Hancock 490
|
| 
||
|Michael Malley
|-
| style="background:whitesmoke;"|13. Miramichi Centre
|
|Kim Jardine 3,149
||
|John Foran 3,763
|
|Lance Lyons 663
|
| 
||
|Kim Jardine
|-
| style="background:whitesmoke;"|14. Southwest Miramichi
|
|Norman Betts 2,823
||
|Rick Brewer 3,395
|
|Chris Ashford 332
|
| 
||
|Norman Betts
|-
| style="background:whitesmoke;"|15. Rogersville-Kouchibouguac
||
|Rose-May Poirier 3,289
|
|Maurice Richard 2,968
|
|Oscar Doucet 404
|
| 
||
|Rose-May Poirier
|-
| style="background:whitesmoke;"|16. Kent
|
|Valmond Joseph Daigle 1,905
||
|Shawn Graham 3,615
|
|Jerry Cook 958
|
| 
||
|Shawn Graham
|-
| style="background:whitesmoke;"|17. Kent South
||
|Claude Williams 4,933
|
|Stephen Doucet 4,065
|
|Neil Gardner 671
|
| 
||
|Claude Williams
|-
| style="background:whitesmoke;"|18. Shediac-Cap-Pélé
|
|Odette Babineau 3,063
||
|Bernard Richard 6,464
|
|Claudette Beland 313
|
| 
||
|Bernard Richard
|}

Southeastern New Brunswick

|-
| style="background:whitesmoke;"|19. Tantramar
||
|Peter Mesheau 2,922
|
|Susan Purdy 1,569
|
|Geoff Martin 522
|
| 
||
|Peter Mesheau
|-
| style="background:whitesmoke;"|20. Dieppe-Memramcook
||
|Cy LeBlanc 5,541
|
|Elie Richard 5,451
|
|Hélène Lapointe 786
|
| 
||
|Cy LeBlanc
|-
| style="background:whitesmoke;"|21. Moncton East
||
|Bernard Lord 4,177
|
|Chris Collins 3,113
|
|Jean-Marie Nadeau 724
|
| 
||
|Bernard Lord
|-
| style="background:whitesmoke;"|22. Moncton South
||
|Joan MacAlpine 3,143
|
|Norman Branch 2,710
|
|Stéphane Drysdale 437
|
|Jean-Marc Dugas (Ind.) 226John Gallant (Grey) 72
||
|Joan MacAlpine
|-
| style="background:whitesmoke;"|23. Moncton North
|
|René Landry 3,054
||
|Mike Murphy 3,555
|
|Nancy McBain 543
|
| 
||
|René Landry
|-
| style="background:whitesmoke;"|24. Moncton Crescent
||
|John Betts 4,230
|
|Ray Goudreau 3,776
|
|Richard Goulding 628
|
| 
||
|John Betts
|-
| style="background:whitesmoke;"|25. Petitcodiac
||
|Wally Stiles 3,481
|
|Bethany Dykstra 1,849
|
|Tracy Trott 298
|
|Dan Leaman (Grey) 120
||
|Wally Stiles
|-
| style="background:whitesmoke;"|26. Riverview
||
|Bruce Fitch 3,794
|
|Ward White 3,287
|
|John Falconer 391
|
| 
||
|vacant
|-
| style="background:whitesmoke;"|27. Albert
||
|Wayne Steeves 3,198
|
|Clark Butland 2,311
|
|Pat Pearson 457
|
| 
||
|Wayne Steeves
|-
| style="background:whitesmoke;"|28. Kings East
|
|Doug Cosman 2,713
||
|Leroy Armstrong 3,169
|
|George Horton 996
|
| 
||
|Doug Cosman
|}

Greater Saint John & Fundy Coast

|-
| style="background:whitesmoke;"|29. Hampton-Belleisle
||
|Bev Harrison 3,392
|
|Bob Bates 2,736
|
|Pat Hanratty 1,336
|
|John Hughes (Grey) 208
||
|Bev Harrison
|-
| style="background:whitesmoke;"|30. Kennebecasis
||
|Brenda Fowlie 3,265
|
|Murray Driscoll 3,247
|
|Kenneth Wilcox 970
|
| 
||
|Brenda Fowlie
|-
| style="background:whitesmoke;"|31. Saint John-Fundy
|
|Rodney Weston 2,271
||
|Stuart Jamieson 2,698
|
|Liam Freill 517
|
|Marjorie MacMurray (Grey) 172
||
|Rodney Weston
|-
| style="background:whitesmoke;"|32. Saint John-Kings
||
|Margaret-Ann Blaney 3,135
|
|Tom Young 2,456
|
|Jeff Thibodeau 791
|
|Mark LeBlanc (Grey) 145
||
|Margaret-Ann Blaney
|-
| style="background:whitesmoke;"|33. Saint John Champlain
|
|Mel Vincent 1,501
||
|Roly MacIntyre 2,160
|
|Ralph Thomas 1,507
|
|Bill Richard Reid (Grey) 223
||
|Carole Keddy
|-
| style="background:whitesmoke;"|34. Saint John Harbour
|
|Dennis Boyle 1,286
|
|Anne-Marie Mullin 1,231
||
|Elizabeth Weir 1,929
|
| 
||
|Elizabeth Weir
|-
| style="background:whitesmoke;"|35. Saint John Portland
||
|Trevor Holder 2,436
|
|Colleen Knudson 2,307
|
|Mary Arseneau 1,191
| 
| 
||
|Trevor Holder
|-
| style="background:whitesmoke;"|36. Saint John Lancaster
|
|Norm McFarlane 2,633
||
|Abel LeBlanc 2,942
|
|Walter Lee 1,365
| 
|Jim Webb (Grey) 170
||
|Norm McFarlane
|-
| style="background:whitesmoke;"|37. Grand Bay-Westfield
||
|Milt Sherwood 2,209
|
|Kevin Quinn 1,991
|
|Percy Ward 556
| 
|Ben Perry (Grey) 193Colby Fraser (Ind.) 189 
||
|Milt Sherwood
|-
| style="background:whitesmoke;"|38. Charlotte
|
|Sharon Tucker 1,573
||
|Rick Doucet 2,777
|
|Patty Hooper 1,149
| 
|Harold Smith (Grey) 118
||
|Sheldon Lee
|-
| style="background:whitesmoke;"|39. Fundy Isles
|
|Burton Flynn 1,124
||
|Eric Allaby 1,359
|
|Dick Grant 94
| 
| 
||
|Eric Allaby
|-
| style="background:whitesmoke;"|40. Western Charlotte
||
|Tony Huntjens 2,854
|
|Madeleine Drummie 2,662
|
|Andrew Graham 554
| 
| 
||
|Tony Huntjens
|}

Greater Fredericton

|-
| style="background:whitesmoke;"|41. Oromocto-Gagetown
||
|Jody Carr 4,314
|
|Maurice Harquail 2,140
|
|Terry Hovey 392
| 
|James Lee (Grey) 129
||
|Jody Carr
|-
| style="background:whitesmoke;"|42. Grand Lake
|
|David Jordan 2,058
||
|Eugene McGinley 4,376
|
|David Babineau 614
| 
| 
||
|David Jordan
|-
| style="background:whitesmoke;"|43. Fredericton North
|
|D. Peter Forbes 3,211
||
|T.J. Burke 4,163
|
|Dennis Atchison 1,418
| 
| 
||
|D. Peter Forbes
|-
| style="background:whitesmoke;"|44. Fredericton-Fort Nashwaak
|
|Eric MacKenzie 2,364
||
|Kelly Lamrock 2,925
|
|Penny Ericson 1,531
| 
| 
||
|Eric MacKenzie
|-
| style="background:whitesmoke;"|45. Fredericton South
||
|Brad Green 3,309
|
|Misty McLaughlin 2,797
|
|Nan Luke 1,832
| 
| 
||
|Brad Green
|-
| style="background:whitesmoke;"|46. New Maryland
||
|Keith Ashfield 3,719
|
|Joan Kingston 3,502
|
|Kay Nandlall 923
| 
| 
||
|Keith Ashfield
|-
| style="background:whitesmoke;"|47. York
|
|Don Kinney 3,278
||
|Scott Targett 3,783
|
|Gary Hughes 618
| 
| 
||
|Don Kinney
|-
| style="background:whitesmoke;"|48. Mactaquac
||
|Kirk MacDonald 3,337
|
|Ray Dillon 3,236
|
|Phillip Morgan 817
| 
| 
||
|Kirk MacDonald
|}

Upper Saint John River Valley

|-
| style="background:whitesmoke;"|49. Woodstock
||
|David Alward 4,605
|
|Lorne Drake 2,400
|
|Nancy Reid 286
| 
| 
||
|David Alward
|-
| style="background:whitesmoke;"|50. Carleton
||
|Dale Graham 4,190
|
|Grant Robinson 2,287
|
|Betty Brown 482
| 
| 
||
|Dale Graham
|-
| style="background:whitesmoke;"|51. Victoria-Tobique
|
|Dennis Campbell 2,001
||
|Larry Kennedy 3,386
|
|Harvey Bass 502
| 
| 
||
|Larry Kennedy
|-
| style="background:whitesmoke;"|52. Grand Falls Region
|
|Jean-Guy Laforest 2,586
||
|Ron Ouellette 4,385 
|
|Pierre Cyr 192
| 
| 
||
|Jean-Guy Laforest
|-
| style="background:whitesmoke;"|53. Madawaska-la-Vallée
||
|Percy Mockler 3,858
|
|Claude Malenfant 1,848
|
|Mario Fortunato 201
| 
| 
||
|Percy Mockler
|-
| style="background:whitesmoke;"|54. Edmundston
||
|Madeleine Dubé 3,917
|
|Margot Albert 1,841
|
|Blair McInnis 110
| 
| 
||
|Madeleine Dubé
|-
| style="background:whitesmoke;"|55. Madawaska-les-Lacs
||
|Jeannot Volpé 3,965
|
|Louis LaBrie 2,391
|
|Jason Carney 187
| 
| 
||
|Jeannot Volpé
|}

See also

References

Further reading
 

New Brunswick general
Elections in New Brunswick
2003 in New Brunswick
June 2003 events in Canada